This page lists bases and airports operated or used by the Islamic Republic of Iran Air Force (IRIAF). Categories include: (1) Tactical Air Bases (TAB), the 17 major IRIAF operational air bases, (2) Other Military Aviation Installations and joint civil/military, installations without TAB designation numbers, and (3) Civil Airports, facilities under civil authority that sources indicate to be of strategic importance to the IRIAF for contingency scenarios, etc.

Tactical air bases
 TAB 1 – Mehrabad International Airport –  – F-14s located at this base
 TAB 2 – Tabriz Air Base – 
 TAB 3 – Hamadan Airbase (Shahrokhi Air Base) –  – F-4D/Es reported to serve here, 1990s
 TAB 4 – Vahdati Air Base (Dezful) – 
 TAB 5 – Omidiyeh Air Base – 
 TAB 6 – Bushehr Airport –  – F-4D/Es reported to serve here, 1990s
 TAB 7 – Shiraz International Airport – 
 TAB 8 – Isfahan International Airport –  – F-14 Tomcats based here
 TAB 9 – Bandar Abbas International Airport –  – F-4D/Es reported to serve here, 1990s
 TAB 10 – Chahbahar Air Airport – 
 TAB 11 – Doshan Tappeh Air Base – 
 TAB 12 – Birjand International Airport – 
 TAB 13 – Zahedan International Airport – 
 TAB 14 – Mashhad International Airport – 
 TAB 15 – Kermanshah Airport –  
 TAB 16 – Kerman Airport – 
 TAB 17 – Shahid Asyaee Airport (Masjed Soleyman) –

Former military aviation installations
 TAB 00 – Ghale Morghi Air Base (Qaleh Morgi) – 

converted into VELAYAT park

Other military aviation installations
 Ahmadi Military Air Field – 
 Badr Air Base (Sepah Air Base) – 
 Bishe Kola Air Base – 
 Darrahi Military Air Field – 
 Gorreh Military Air Field – 
 Hesa Air Base – 
 Jask Air Field – 
 Kashan Air Base – 
 Kish Island Airport (civil/military) – 
 Kushke Nosrat Airport (Manzariyeh) – 
 Nain Air Base – 
 Naja Air Base – 
 Qezel Qeshl Ag Military Air Field – 
 Shahid Vatan Pour Air Base – 
 Soga Air Base – 
 Urumiyeh Airport (civil/military) –

Civil airports
 Abadan-Ayatollah Jami International Airport – 
 Abdanan Air Field – 
 Abamusa Island Airport – 
 Aghajari Airport – 
 Ahvaz Airport – 
 Bandar Lengeh Airport – 
 Bastak Airport – 
 Gachsaran Air Field – 
 Gorgan Airport – 
 Ilam Airport – 
 Khanian Air Field – 
 Khark Island Airport – 
 Khorramabad Airport – 
 Noshahr Airport – 
 Parsabad-Moghan Airport – 
 Qazvin Airport – 
 Rasht Airport – 
 Ramsar Airport – 
 Sabzevar Airport – 
 Sahand Airport (Maragheh) – 
 Shahabad Highway Strip – 
 Yazd Shahid Sadooghi Airport –

See also
 List of airports in Iran
 Islamic Republic of Iran Air Force
 Military of Iran

References

 GlobalSecurity.org, Iranian Air Fields and Bases
 Federation of American Scientists, Iranian Air Fields
 Islamic Republic of Iran Air Arms at Scramble Magazine - Dutch Aviation Society

 
Air Force bases
Iran